Andevar (also Romanized as Andevār and Andavār) is a village located in a mountainous area on the Alborz Haraz road, in the Central District of Amol County, Mazandaran Province, Iran. At the 2006 census, its population was 226, in 54 families.

References 

Populated places in Amol County